Phytoecia nigricornis is a species of beetle in the family Cerambycidae. It was described by Johan Christian Fabricius in 1781, originally under the genus Saperda. It has a wide distribution throughout Europe. It feeds on Glebionis segetum, Solidago virgaurea, Artemisia campestris, Artemisia absinthium, Artemisia vulgaris, Artemisia sieversiana, Leucanthemum vulgare, and Tanacetum vulgare.

Varietas
 Phytoecia nigricornis var. solidaginis Bach, 1856
 Phytoecia nigricornis var. julii Mulsant, 1863

References

Phytoecia
Beetles described in 1781